Stenoscaptia is a genus of moths in the family Erebidae.

Species
 Stenoscaptia aroa Bethune-Baker, 1904
 Stenoscaptia bipartita (Rothschild, 1913)
 Stenoscaptia dichromus Rothschild, 1916
 Stenoscaptia fovealis Hampson, 1903
 Stenoscaptia latifascia Rothschild, 1916
 Stenoscaptia niveiceps Rothschild, 1913
 Stenoscaptia venusta Lucas, 1890

Former species
 Stenoscaptia phlogozona Turner, 1904

References

Natural History Museum Lepidoptera generic names catalog

Nudariina
Moth genera